Benny Carter 4: Montreux '77 is an album by saxophonist/composer Benny Carter recorded at the Montreux Jazz Festival in 1977 and released by the Pablo label.

Reception

AllMusic reviewer Scott Yanow stated "For this concert at the 1977 Montreux Jazz Festival, Benny Carter was in his musical prime, a condition he has thus far stayed at for over 65 years. Joined by the Ray Bryant Trio, the altoist romps through seven standards and plays some tasteful trumpet on "Body and Soul," proving once again that he is really is ageless; Carter was nearly 70 years old at the time".

Track listing
 "Three Little Words" (Harry Ruby, Bert Kalmar) – 5:30
 "In a Mellow Tone" (Duke Ellington, Milt Gabler) – 8:13
 "Wave" (Antônio Carlos Jobim) – 6:04
 "Undecided" (Sid Robin, Charlie Shavers) – 5:27
 "Body and Soul" (Johnny Green, Edward Heyman, Robert Sour, Frank Eyton) – 6:39
 "On Green Dolphin Street" (Bronisław Kaper, Ned Washington) – 5:58
 "Here's That Rainy Day" (Jimmy Van Heusen, Johnny Burke) – 5:51

Personnel 
Benny Carter – alto saxophone, trumpet
Ray Bryant – piano
Niels Pedersen – bass
Jimmie Smith – drums

References 

1977 live albums
Benny Carter live albums
Pablo Records live albums
Albums recorded at the Montreux Jazz Festival